Gondal may refer to:

Places
 Gondal, India, a city in Gujarat, India
 Gondal Assembly constituency
 Gondal railway station
 Gondal State, a princely state of the Bombay Presidency in colonial India
 Gondal, Attock, a town in Pakistan
 Gondal Bar, a region in Punjab, Pakistan
 Gondal, Somalia, an ancient town in Somalia
 Gondal (fictional country), a fictional country created by Emily and Anne Brontë

People
 Gondal (clan), a clan of Jats and a surname in Pakistan
 Nazar Muhammad Gondal (born 1950), Pakistani politician
 Usman Gondal (born 1987), Pakistani footballer
 Vishal Gondal (born 1976), Indian entrepreneur

See also
 Gondal Gilan, a village in Iran
 Gondalpara, a town in West Bengal, India
 Gundala gondal, a village in India